Rubén Oarbeascoa Ispizua (born 21 November 1975 in Gernika) is a former Spanish cyclist.

Palmares

1999 
1st Bizkaiko Bira

References

1975 births
Living people
Spanish male cyclists
People from Guernica
Sportspeople from Biscay
Cyclists from the Basque Country (autonomous community)